Vrsno is a small village in the Municipality of Kobarid in the Littoral region of Slovenia.

Vrsno is best known as the birthplace of the poet Simon Gregorčič. Since 1966, Gregorčič's home has housed a small ethnographic museum with some exhibits from the poet's life. The museum also showcases the poet's artistic work, displays a timeline of historic events that occurred in his lifetime, and presents his relatives and notable contemporaries.

Notable people
Notable people that were born or lived in Vrsno include:
Anton Gregorčič (1852–1925), conservative politician
Simon Gregorčič (1844–1906), poet

References

External links
Vrsno on Geopedia

Populated places in the Municipality of Kobarid